Oksu Station is a station on the Line 3 and the Gyeongui–Jungang Line. It is located near the confluence of the Han and Jungnang Rivers.

The Line 3 part of Oksu Station is one of four stations on Line 3 not underground (The others are Jichuk, Wondang, and Daegok). The Yongsan-Deokso Line part was recently renovated with a glass-covered top which lets in sunlight. Because of its beautiful view of the Han River, it is often seen in movies and advertisements. The manhwa webtoon Oksu Station Ghost is set at the Line 3 platforms.

Gallery

Neighborhood
 Okjeong Elementary School: Exit 5
 Malaysian Embassy: Exit 4, 15 minutes walk.

References

External links
 Station information from Korail

Seoul Metropolitan Subway stations
Metro stations in Seongdong District
Railway stations in Seoul
Seoul Subway Line 3
Gyeongui–Jungang Line
Gyeongwon Line
Gyeongchun Line
Railway stations in South Korea opened in 1985